Kang Sunghee (1921–2009) was a Korean playwright. In 1965, she made her literary debut with the play  ( Lullaby). Many of her works address problems that women face in the traditional institution of family. Where Did You Go, Where Are You!), she successfully showed that men are also victims of old customs while exposing their egocentric and self-righteous aspects. She served as the president of the Korean Playwrights Association from 1981 to 1982.

Life 
Born in Pyongyang in 1921, Kang Sunghee spent her childhood in Andong Province, Manchukuo, because of her father's business. She was able to receive modern education from young age thanks to her parents’ wholehearted support. She studied abroad in Japan, where she attended a teacher's school. After Japan lost World War II, Kang returned to Korea and majored in English literature. She said she became interested in writing plays after starring in James Barrie's Quality Street as part of her graduation project. Upon graduation, however, she got a job as an English teacher at a high school and married artist Ryu Kyung-Chai, who taught art at the same school. Marriage, childbirth, and the outbreak of the Korean War delayed her from starting her career in writing. Her dream of becoming a playwright only came true years later.    

In 1965, Kang published  and debuted as a playwright at the age of 45. For over 30 years, she consistently wrote plays. Her play  ( Something's Definitely Wrong), published in 1967, received a great deal of attention and was staged several times by college students in the 1970s. From 1970, she was an active member of the Korean Writers Association, Korean Women Writers Association, and the Korean Centre of PEN International. She served as the president of the Korean Playwrights Association from 1981 to 1982 and as a board member of the Korean Centre of PEN the International from 1988 to 1995. In 1997, she became a member of the National Academy of Arts of the Republic of Korea.    

Kang's 1986 play  ( White Blossom Village) earned her a PEN International Literary Award in 1987 and the Literary Drama Award from the Korean Playwright Association in 1988. For her contribution to Korean culture, she received the Republic of Korea's Bogwan Order of Cultural Merit in 1998 and the National Academy of Arts Award in 2000. Her husband, artist Ryu Kyung-Chai, died in 1995, followed by their son, sculptor Ryu In, in 1999. Afterward, Kang wrote a memoir of her family life. She died in 2009.

Writing 
Kang Sunghee used stylish expressions and concise sentences that stems from her background in English literature. Aside from one of her earlier works, most of her plays handle the conflicts between reality and ideals the characters face with a heavy and serious tone. This is a projection of her own experience, as Kang herself was unable to start her writing career for a long time despite her studying English literature and her interest in playwriting. Repeatedly portraying women who are conflicted between the love for her family and the ideal life of an artist, Kang not only describes the pressure that family life puts on women but also the effect of historical tragedies, such as the Korean War, on individuals’ lives.  

The anguish of the modern people whose desire to lead an ideal life is prevented by realistic constraints is an issue that Kang has addressed consistently through her plays. Through , a play about the tragic life of Na Hye-sok, the first female artist in Korea to specialize in Western-style painting, Kang asks why the discrepancy between reality and ideal was particularly harsher on women.

In this way, Kang Sunghee portrayed the inner conflicts of artists, women, and intellectuals in her works that were motivated by her own experiences in modern Korean history and the family institution that was particularly harder on women. One thing of note is that she does not place women and men, members of the pro-Japan faction and independence activists under the dichotomy of good and evil. But instead of judging them, Kang focuses on revealing their inner struggles and conflicts. Likewise, in biographical plays that depict women who have difficulty finding and fulfilling themselves in their families, Kang focuses on portraying the protagonists’ inner struggles between the love of their families and the desire to fulfill themselves, instead of exposing the contradictions in the institution of family. As a result, her plays are characterized by emphasis on individuals’ inner thoughts that lead to the formation of universal consensus.      

In 1993, Kang published  ( The Sound of Vengeful Spirits). Released immediately after the results of the Japanese government investigated the issue of Japanese military comfort women, this play lends an ear to the voices of comfort women who had been silenced for a long time. Kang was able to address the issue of comfort women relatively earlier than others because of her artistic world and belief that the cause of the tragic lives and struggles of individuals is based on history and realities.

Works

1. Complete works 
《, 1996 /  (five volumes) (The Complete Collection of Plays by Kang Sunghee), Hannuri Media, 1996.

2. Plays 
, 1977 /  (Two Faces), Kyohaksa, 1977.

, 1982  (Freedom as Big as This World), Taemen, 1982.

, 1986 /  (White Blossom Village), Beommunsa, 1986.

, 1991 /  (Afternoon of a Soul), Dong Suh Book, 1991.

, 2000 /  (This is Myeongryun-dong), Korean Literature Library, 2000.

, 2002 /  (A Power Stronger than Death), Dapgae, 2002.

, 2003 /  (Yearning), Dapgae, 2003.

3. Musical 
, 2004 /  (A Festival of Love), Dong Suk Book, 2004.

4. Memoir 
, 2007 /  (Traces: The Memoir of Passion), Dong Suh Book, 2007.

Awards 
P.E.N International Literary Award (drama) (1987)

Korean Playwright Association Literary Drama Award (1988)

Korean Literature Award (drama) (1996)

Bogwan Order of Cultural Merit (1998)

National Academy of Arts of the Republic of Korea Award (theater, film, and dance) (2000)

Olbit Award for Women in Theater (drama) (2006)

References 

2009 deaths
1921 births
20th-century Korean women writers
People from Pyongyang
South Korean dramatists and playwrights
Women dramatists and playwrights